Knud Elon Viggo Andersen (2 July 1900 – 9 January 1967) was a Danish football (soccer) player, who played for B 1903. He was the top goalscorer of the 1938 Danish football championship, and played two games for the Denmark national football team.

References

External links
Danish national team profile

1900 births
1967 deaths
Danish men's footballers
Denmark international footballers
Association football forwards